Laura Robertson (born 17 January 1982) is a New Zealand gymnast. She competed at the 2000 Summer Olympics.

References

External links
 

1982 births
Living people
New Zealand female artistic gymnasts
Olympic gymnasts of New Zealand
Gymnasts at the 2000 Summer Olympics